Staraya Tabaga (Erge Tabağa) is a rural locality (a selo) under the administrative jurisdiction of the city of republic significance of Yakutsk in the Sakha Republic, Russia. Its population as of the 2010 Census was 692.

References

Notes

Sources
Official website of the Sakha Republic. Registry of the Administrative-Territorial Divisions of the Sakha Republic. Yakutsk Urban Okrug. 

Rural localities in Yakutsk